Ainhoa Ibarra Astellara (born 27 October 1968 in Guernica) is a Spanish former alpine skier who competed in the 1988 Winter Olympics, in the 1992 Winter Olympics, in the 1994 Winter Olympics, and in the 1998 Winter Olympics. Her best result was the 17th position in the giant slalom in Lillehammer 1994.

She disputed four World Championships, and her best result was the 8th position in the giant slalom in Sierra Nevada 1996.

In the World Cup she finished top-10 once.

References

1968 births
Living people
Spanish female alpine skiers
Olympic alpine skiers of Spain
Alpine skiers at the 1988 Winter Olympics
Alpine skiers at the 1992 Winter Olympics
Alpine skiers at the 1994 Winter Olympics
Alpine skiers at the 1998 Winter Olympics
People from Guernica
Sportspeople from Biscay